Glucic acid is an acid produced by the action of acids on cane-sugar or of alkalis on glucose.

References 

Organic acids
Aldehydes
Secondary alcohols
3-Hydroxypropenals